The El Paso Bank is a historic commercial building on White County Road 3, east of Arkansas Highway 5 in El Paso, Arkansas.  It is a vernacular single-story brick structure, with a front-facing gable roof.  Its front facade has a fixed-frame window across much of its width, and the main entrance set at an angle on the right corner.  A porch extends across the front, with remnants of latticework supported by turned posts.  Built in 1912, it is the oldest surviving commercial building in the small community.

The building was listed on the National Register of Historic Places in 1991.

See also
National Register of Historic Places listings in White County, Arkansas

References

Bank buildings on the National Register of Historic Places in Arkansas
Commercial buildings completed in 1912
1912 establishments in Arkansas
National Register of Historic Places in White County, Arkansas